Myoxanthus lonchophyllus is a species of orchid endemic to southeastern Brazil. It is found in the Mantiqueira Rain Forest Mountains of Minas Gerais Brazil at elevations of 1000 to 1500 meters.

References

External links 

lonchophyllus
Endemic orchids of Brazil